The Susan Wissler House is a historic house located at 406 Main St. in Dayton, Wyoming. The house was the home of Susan Wissler, the mayor of Dayton from 1911 to 1914; Wissler was the first female mayor in Wyoming and one of the first in the United States. The house was constructed in 1885 as a commercial building with a residence on the upper floor; the building features a false front and has kept its historical condition. Wissler lived in the house from 1905 to 1915, including the duration of her term as mayor.

The house was added to the National Register of Historic Places on March 8, 1984.

References

External links

Houses on the National Register of Historic Places in Wyoming
Houses in Sheridan County, Wyoming
National Register of Historic Places in Sheridan County, Wyoming
Western false front architecture
Commercial buildings completed in 1885
Commercial buildings on the National Register of Historic Places in Wyoming
Houses completed in 1885